Viktor Mikhailovich Yefteni (born 2 February 1973) is a Ukrainian wrestler. He competed in the men's freestyle 48 kg at the 1996 Summer Olympics.  He graduated from the K. D. Ushinsky South Ukrainian National Pedagogical University in 2009.

References

External links
 

1973 births
Living people
Ukrainian male sport wrestlers
Olympic wrestlers of Ukraine
Wrestlers at the 1996 Summer Olympics
Ukrainian people of Moldovan descent
People from Gagauzia
K. D. Ushinsky South Ukrainian National Pedagogical University alumni